The Blue Hole is an attraction on the island of Big Pine Key in the Florida Keys. It is an abandoned rock quarry that was used for nearby road fills and Henry Flagler's Overseas Railroad. The water it contains is mostly fresh and is used by various wildlife in the area, such as birds, snakes, alligators, key deer and green iguanas. It is part of the National Key Deer Refuge.

Gallery

References

External links 

History of Big Pine Key at keyshistory.org
Big Pine Key Information at florida-keys.cc (archived)

Tourist attractions in the Florida Keys